Gambit is a British game show based on the American version of the same name. It first aired on ITV from 3 July 1975 to 28 May 1985, hosted by Fred Dinenage from 1975 to 1982 and finally hosted by Tom O'Connor from 1983 to 1985. It was revived from 23 July to 5 November 1995 only in the Anglia region with Gary Thompson as host.

Gameplay

Original Version

Main Game
The object of the game was that of blackjack: come as close to 21 as possible without going over (or "busting"). As in blackjack, the cards from 2 to 10 were worth their face value; picture cards (Kings, Queens and Jacks) counted as 10 and an Ace could count as either 1 or 11.

The host asked a series of questions, usually multiple-choice or true-false, to two married couples. The couple who buzzed in and answered the question correctly won control of the next card from the top of a deck of over-sized (but otherwise regulation) playing cards. The first card was shown before the first question, but cards thereafter were presented face down.

Once a couple gained control of a card they had the option of adding it to their own hand or passing it to their opponents. After a couple received any card (whether by choosing to take it themselves or by having a card passed to them from their opponents) they could elect to stick if they were in the lead with at least 12 points (neither team was permitted to stick when the two were tied), preventing them from receiving any additional cards. This rule prevented their opponents from passing cards to them in order to strategically force them to bust.

Once this happened, the other couple answered up to three questions in an attempt to best their opponents.

Play continues until one of the following conditions occurred:

Conditions for winning
 Reaching 21, which not only won the game, but the Gambit Jackpot, which started at £200 and went up £50 every time it wasn't won, up to the maximum of £500.
 Having their opponents exceed 21 ("bust"), even if the winners had no cards.
 Sticking, and then having the opponents miss two questions before getting a higher score without going over 21 or simply not get enough to beat their opponents' score.
 Having the opponents stick, and then getting a higher score without going over 21.

Each game won was worth £20. The first team to win two games won the match, a total of £40 and advanced to the bonus round.

The Gambit Board
The winning couple played the Gambit Bonus Board. They faced a large game board with 21 numbered cards. Each card concealed a prize; along with each prize the couple chose, they received a card added to their hand from the deck. They can choose any number from 1-20 (the 21st space offered a choice of star prizes).

The game ended in one of three ways:
 The couple elected to stop before reaching 21 (especially if they feared the next card would push them over 21 or in some instances, if they won a desirable prize they wanted to keep) and keep all the prizes they've chosen to that point.
 Going over 21, at which point they lost everything from the board.
 Reaching 21 exactly, wherein they won a choice of star prizes behind #21 and the prizes selected.
Couples who won a star prize or played the Gambit Board twice retired undefeated.

1995 version 
For this version, the rules and setup were radically different (inspired by an unsold American Gambit pilot from 1990). Two solo players competed, and were asked a question with two possible answers. The answers would appear on a video screen to the right of the host's podium and the contestant who rang in would have to determine if one, both, or neither of the two answers applied to the question. Answering a question correctly would earn them a card, which they had the option of passing or keeping. As before, contestants had the option of sticking.

Transmissions

References

External links

1975 British television series debuts
1995 British television series endings
1970s British game shows
1980s British game shows
1990s British game shows
English-language television shows
ITV game shows
Television series by ITV Studios
Television shows produced by Anglia Television
British television series revived after cancellation